Petrophile stricta is a species of flowering plant in the family Proteaceae and is endemic to the south-west of Western Australia. It is an erect, spreading shrub with needle-shaped, sharply-pointed leaves, and oval heads of hairy, pink to cream-coloured flowers.

Description

Taxonomy
Petrophile stricta was first formally described in 1990 by Donald Bruce Foreman in the journal Muelleria from and unpublished description by Charles Gardner. The specific epithet (stricta) means "straight, erect or rigid".

Distribution and habitat
This petrophile grows in sandy shrubland and scrub in sandy-gravelly soils over laterite on sandplains, ridges and low hills in the drier, inland parts in the Avon Wheatbelt, Coolgardie and Mallee biogeographic regions in the south-west of Western Australia.

Conservation status
Petrophile stricta is classified as "not threatened" by the Government of Western Australia Department of Parks and Wildlife.

References

stricta
Eudicots of Western Australia
Endemic flora of Western Australia
Plants described in 1990